Milan's Zoo was a zoo in Milan, Lombardy, northern Italy, created in the Indro Montanelli Public Gardens in 1932 and closed in 1992.

References 

Zoos in Italy
Parks in Lombardy
Zoos established in 1932
Zoos disestablished in 1992
Parks in Milan
Former zoos
Articles containing video clips